Reyhan is a unisex given name and a surname. Notable people with the name are as follows:

Given name

Female
 Reyhan Angelova (1986–2005), Bulgarian Romani singer
 Reyhan Jamalova, Azerbaijani businesswoman
 Reyhan Karaca (born 1970), Turkish singer
 Reyhan Şahin (born 1981), German radio host
 Reyhan Şeker (born 1984), Turkish football player
 Reyhan Topchubashova (1905–1970), Azerbaijani painter
 Reyhan Yılmaz (born 2001), Turkish goalball player
 Reyhan Yüksekoğlu (born 1980), Turkish football player

Male
 Reyhan Arabacıoğlu (born 1980), Turkish weightlifter
Reyhan Özgür (born 1978), Turkish diplomat

Middle name
 Abū Rayḥān al-Bīrūnī (973-1048), Muslim scholar and polymath
 Syed Rayhan ad-Din, Persian poet of Bengal

Surname
 Ada Rehan, American actress

Turkish unisex given names
Arabic feminine given names
Azerbaijani feminine given names